The team jumping event was part of the equestrian programme at the 1920 Summer Olympics.

Results

The riders who competed in the individual jumping event were not allowed to participate also on the team.

References

Sources
 
 

Jumping team